Aphyosemion is a genus of African rivulines endemic as the name indicates to Africa. Many of these species are popular aquarium fish.

Species

There are currently 100 recognized species in this genus:
 Aphyosemion abacinum Huber, 1976
 Aphyosemion ahli G. S. Myers, 1933
 Aphyosemion alpha Huber, 1998
 Aphyosemion amoenum Radda & Pürzl, 1976 (Red-finned killifish)
 Aphyosemion aureum Radda, 1980 (Golden killifish)
 Aphyosemion australe (Rachow, 1921) (Lyre-tail killifish)
 Aphyosemion bamilekorum Radda, 1971 (Bamileke killifish)
 Aphyosemion batesii (Boulenger, 1911) (Bates' killifish)
 Aphyosemion bitaeniatum (C. G. E. Ahl, 1924) (Two-striped killifish)
 Aphyosemion bitteri Valdesalici & Eberl, 2016 
 Aphyosemion bivittatum (Lönnberg, 1895) (Two-stripe lyretail)
 Aphyosemion bualanum (C. G. E. Ahl, 1924)
 Aphyosemion buytaerti Radda & Huber, 1978
 Aphyosemion callipteron (Radda & Pürzl, 1987)
 Aphyosemion calliurum (Boulenger, 1911) (Banner lyretail)
 Aphyosemion cameronense (Boulenger, 1903) (Cameroon killifish)
 Aphyosemion campomaanense Agnèse, Brummett, Caminade, Catalan & Kornobis, 2009
 Aphyosemion castaneum G. S. Myers, 1924
 Aphyosemion caudofasciatum Huber & Radda, 1979 (Caudal-stripe killifish)
 Aphyosemion celiae Scheel, 1971
 Aphyosemion chauchei Huber & Scheel, 1981
 Aphyosemion christyi (Boulenger, 1915) (Christy's lyretail)
 Aphyosemion citrineipinnis Huber & Radda, 1977
 Aphyosemion coeleste Huber & Radda, 1977 (Sky-blue killifish)
 Aphyosemion cognatum Meinken, 1951 (Red-spot killifish)
 Aphyosemion congicum (C. G. E. Ahl, 1924) (Congo killifish)
 Aphyosemion cyanostictum J. G. Lambert & Géry, 1968 (Gabon jewel killifish)
 Aphyosemion dargei Amiet, 1987 (M'bam killifish)
 Aphyosemion decorsei (Pellegrin, 1904)
 Aphyosemion ecucuense (Sonnenberg, 2008)
 Aphyosemion edeanum Amiet, 1987 (Edea killifish)
 Aphyosemion elberti (C. G. E. Ahl, 1924) (Red-barred killifish)
 Aphyosemion elegans (Boulenger, 1899) (Elegant killifish)
 Aphyosemion erythron (Sonnenberg, 2008)
 Aphyosemion escherichi (C. G. E. Ahl, 1924) (Escherich's killifish)
 Aphyosemion etsamense Sonnenberg & T. Blum, 2005
 Aphyosemion exigoideum Radda & Huber, 1977 (False jewel killifish)
 Aphyosemion exiguum (Boulenger, 1911) (Jewel killifish)
 Aphyosemion fellmanni van der Zee & Sonnenberg, 2018
 Aphyosemion ferranti (Boulenger, 1910)
 Aphyosemion franzwerneri Scheel, 1971 (Goby killifish)
 Aphyosemion fulgens Radda, 1975
 Aphyosemion gabunense Radda, 1975 (Gabon killifish)
 Aphyosemion georgiae J. G. Lambert & Géry, 1968
 Aphyosemion grelli Valdesalici & Eberl, 2013 
 Aphyosemion hanneloreae Radda & Pürzl, 1985 (Hannelore's killifish)
 Aphyosemion heinemanni Berkenkamp, 1983 (Heinemann's killifish)
 Aphyosemion hera Huber, 1998
 Aphyosemion herzogi Radda, 1975 (Herzog's killifish)
 Aphyosemion hofmanni Radda, 1980 (Hofmann's killifish)
 Aphyosemion jeanhuberi Valdesalici & Eberl, 2015 
 Aphyosemion joergenscheeli Huber & Radda, 1977
 Aphyosemion kouamense Legros, 1999
 Aphyosemion koungueense (Sonnenberg, 2007)
 Aphyosemion labarrei Poll, 1951
 Aphyosemion lamberti Radda & Huber, 1977
 Aphyosemion lefiniense Woeltjes, 1984
 Aphyosemion lividum Legros & Zentz, 2007
 Aphyosemion loennbergii (Boulenger, 1903)
 Aphyosemion louessense (Pellegrin, 1931) 
 Aphyosemion lugens Amiet, 1991
 Aphyosemion lujae (Boulenger, 1911)
 Aphyosemion maculatum Radda & Pürzl, 1977
 Aphyosemion malumbresi Legros & Zentz, 2006
 Aphyosemion melanogaster (Legros, Zentz & Agnèse, 2005)
 Aphyosemion melinoeides (Sonnenberg, 2007)
 Aphyosemion mengilai Valdesalici & Eberl, 2014 
 Aphyosemion mimbon Huber, 1977
 Aphyosemion musafirii van der Zee & Sonnenberg, 2011
 Aphyosemion ocellatum Huber & Radda, 1977
 Aphyosemion ogoense (Pellegrin, 1930)
 Aphyosemion omega (Sonnenberg, 2007)
 Aphyosemion pamaense Agnèse, Legros, Cazaux & Estivals, 2013 
 Aphyosemion pascheni (C. G. E. Ahl, 1928)
 Aphyosemion passaroi Huber, 1994
 Aphyosemion plagitaenium Huber, 2004
 Aphyosemion poliaki Amiet, 1991
 Aphyosemion polli Radda & Pürzl, 1987
 Aphyosemion primigenium Radda & Huber, 1977
 Aphyosemion pseudoelegans Sonnenberg & van der Zee, 2012 
 Aphyosemion punctatum Radda & Pürzl, 1977
 Aphyosemion punctulatum (Legros, Zentz & Agnèse, 2005)
 Aphyosemion raddai Scheel, 1975
 Aphyosemion rectogoense Radda & Huber, 1977
 Aphyosemion riggenbachi (C. G. E. Ahl, 1924)
 Aphyosemion schioetzi Huber & Scheel, 1981
 Aphyosemion schluppi Radda & Huber, 1978
 Aphyosemion schoutedeni (Boulenger, 1920)
 Aphyosemion seegersi Huber, 1980
 Aphyosemion splendopleure (Brüning, 1929)
 Aphyosemion striatum (Boulenger, 1911)
 Aphyosemion teugelsi van der Zee & Sonnenberg, 2010
 Aphyosemion thysi Radda & Huber, 1978
 Aphyosemion tirbaki Huber, 1999
 Aphyosemion trilineatus (Brüning, 1930)
 Aphyosemion volcanum Radda & Wildekamp, 1977
 Aphyosemion wachtersi Radda & Huber, 1978
 Aphyosemion wildekampi Berkenkamp, 1973
 Aphyosemion wuendschi Radda & Pürzl, 1985 (Wuendsch's killifish)
 Aphyosemion zygaima Huber, 1981

References 

 
Nothobranchiidae
Fish of Africa
Ray-finned fish genera
Freshwater fish genera
Taxa named by George S. Myers